The Cirencester and District League was a football competition based in Gloucestershire, England. It had one division and at level 15 of the English football league system until folding in 2020. It was a feeder to the Cheltenham League or the Stroud League with the champion club being able to progress at a level appropriate to its Gloucestershire County FA County Cup classification.Under the terms of a sponsorship deal, the C&DFL is currently known as the M4 Karting Cirencester and District League. The league is affiliated to the Gloucestershire County FA.

Recent champions

Member clubs 2019–20
Source

Division One
Fratellos
Hatherop
Intel FC
Kingshill Sports
Lechlade
Minety
Poulton
Siddington
South Cerney
Stratton United

References

External links
FA Full time page
Real Fairford Football Club

 
Football leagues in England
Sports leagues established in 1921
1921 establishments in England
Football in Gloucestershire